Melon gravel are a geological deposit of mostly basalt boulders that were formed by the Lake Bonneville flood and deposited along the Snake River Plain in the United States around 15,000 years ago. Melon gravel range in size from course sand to well over 15 feet in diameter, and generally appear rounded. Melon gravel were formed by the Bonneville Flood's intense erosion of the surrounding basalt flows of the area. This process also created several bars of melon gravel that, at their largest, can be 1-mile (1.6 km) long, 1.5-miles (2.41 km) wide, and 150 feet (45.72m) deep.

Melon gravel are considered to be "the most easily recognized evidence of the catastrophic magnitude of the [Bonneville] flood". Melon gravel was named after road signs were put up advertising "petrified watermelons", with one sign urging people to "Take one home to your mother-in-law!"

Petroglyphs 
The petroglyph locations of the Snake River Valley are selectively located on melon gravel. Researchers have pondered why Native American artisans used melon gravel instead of the Snake River Canyon's walls. One theory is that melon gravel were considered a sacred object to the local Native Americans.

In the western United States, power and life were considered to be closely linked with water in Native American spiritual beliefs. Many creation myths follow similar storylines of a water-covered Earth, and animals, like coyotes, turtles, weasels, or other water creatures, creating land and populating it. These beliefs have been recorded among the local indigenous groups in California, the Great Basin, and the Columbia Plateau.

The sacred power of water is also referenced in a Western Shoshone myth of purification:

Rock itself was also considered a powerful spiritual force. Shamans were, and still are, widely believed to have the ability to enter the sacred. One of the ways to enter the sacred was using rock art. In general, rock art is considered in many Native American beliefs to play a key role in myths, historical events, initiation events, and visions.

These ideas are applicable to the melon gravel formed by the Bonneville Flood, since Native populations were able to recognize that melon gravel were formed fluvially and thus attribute a sacred meaning to them, hence why they would choose melon gravel as petroglyph sites.

References

Sedimentology
Flood basalts